ONU may refer to:
 United Nations in other languages, e.g. French Organisation des Nations Unies and Arabic: منظمة الأمم المتحدة
 Olivet Nazarene University
 Ohio Northern University
 Optical Network Unit, the IEEE term for what is called an Optical Network Terminal in ITU-T terminology
 Order of Nunavut
 Organizacion de Narcotraficantes Unidos, a Puerto Rican criminal organization